Aaron Essel (born 30 July 2005) is a Ghanaian professional footballer who plays as defender for Ghanaian Premier League side Bechem United F.C.

Early life 
Essel attended  St. John's School, Sekondi where he captained and played for the school's football team leading them to the final of the Western Regional Inter-schools and Colleges Super Zonals Boys Soccer Competition but lost the ultimate to Takoradi Technical Institute via a 6–5 scoreline on penalty shootouts after a goalless draw at the end of extra time.

Career 
In March 2021, Essel joined Bechem United during the second round transfer period for the 2020–21 season. On 4 April 2021, he made his debut after playing the full 90 minutes in a 2–0 victory over Liberty Professionals. He played the full 90 minutes in their comfortable 4–0 home victory over rivals Aduana Stars on 18 April 2021.

References

External links 

 

Living people
Association football defenders
Ghanaian footballers
2005 births